Angellica Bell (born 24 March 1976) is a British television and radio presenter, best known for her presenting on CBBC between 2000 and 2006. She is also known for providing occasional cover on The One Show and for co-presenting The Martin Lewis Money Show. Bell won the 2017 series of Celebrity MasterChef.

Early life
Bell is of St. Lucian heritage. Born in 1976, Bell was raised a Mormon and educated in Ealing, West London at Notting Hill & Ealing High School. She also studied at the University of the West of England, gaining a BA Honours degree in Politics in 1996.

Career
Bell joined CBBC in May 2000 mainly working as a presenter between shows. She became the main anchor of shows, including That's Genius!, Xchange, 50/50 and Short Change. She has also presented EastEnders Xtra and Dance Xtra.

From 2004 to 2005, she presented CBBC's The Saturday Show. On 1 December 2006, Bell announced she was leaving CBBC.

She presented Holiday Hitsquad, the BBC travel programme formerly known as Departure Lounge. 

Bell's break into adult-mainstream programming appeared on BBC One where she presented The Great British Village Show, with Alan Titchmarsh and James Martin, which was broadcast in the spring of 2007. In March 2007, Bell appeared on Comic Relief does Fame Academy.

Also in 2007, she presented Dance Xtra for BBC Three and Children in Need, and was one of the reporters on The One Show.

In Autumn 2008, she hosted the CBBC show Election, and the ITV2 reality show CelebAir. In 2009, she appeared on All Star Mr & Mrs with her then-fiancė Michael Underwood.

In 2010, Bell presented the ITV programme The Zone with Michael Underwood. That same year, she also presented CBBC's Project Parent.

On 17 July 2011, she appeared as a contestant on Born to Shine. Bell learnt tap dancing but did not make it to the final. On 23 October 2011, Bell co-hosted Something for the Weekend with Tim Lovejoy standing in for Louise Redknapp.

On 1 November 2011, she was runner-up to Rav Wilding on reality series 71 Degrees North. On 21 June 2014, Bell guest-hosted an episode of Weekend Kitchen with Waitrose with Steve Jones and guest hosted on other occasions.

On 31 March 2014, 31 March 2015 and 23 November 2015, Bell was a guest co-presenter on The One Show. She also co-presented four days of shows from 26 October 2015. She regularly is asked to stand in to host the show. On 5 January 2016, Bell appeared on BBC Two in Celebrity Antiques Road Trip. 

Bell stood-in for Barney Harwood on the CBBC show Blue Peter for three months. In 2016, she took part in episodes of Tipping Point: Lucky Stars and The Chase: Celebrity Special on ITV.

From 7–11 March 2016, Bell took part in a challenge for Sport Relief, called 'Hell on High Seas', in which she, along with five other celebrities: Suzi Perry, Doon Mackichan, Alex Jones, Hal Cruttenden and Ore Oduba sailed 1,000 miles from Belfast to London. Coverage of this challenge was shown on The One Show and a special programme aired called Hell on High Seas in March 2016.

In 2016, she narrated the daytime BBC series Family Finders and co-presented Ill Gotten Gains alongside Rav Wilding. She took part in the 2016 series of Tour De Celeb on Channel 5.

In September 2017, Bell won the twelfth series of BBC's Celebrity MasterChef, beating Dev Griffin and Ulrika Jonsson.

In October 2019, Bell was a panellist on BBC celebrity quiz show Richard Osman's House of Games Series 3, Week 2.

Personal life 

Bell married personal trainer Stuart Amory in January 2007. The marriage ended in July 2008.

Bell began a relationship with her former BBC co-star Michael Underwood and they married in New York in December 2010. They have two children.

In August 2014, Bell was one of 200 public figures who were signatories to a letter to The Guardian opposing Scottish independence in the run-up to September's referendum on that issue.

Filmography

References
General
The Independent 5-minute interview
Specific

External links

Angellica Bell on Scala Radio
BBC One Show profile
CBBC's TV Special, "Election"

1976 births
Living people
Black British television personalities
English television presenters
People educated at Notting Hill & Ealing High School
People from Ealing
English people of Saint Lucian descent
Reality cooking competition winners